Benjamin Jeffrey Utecht (born June 30, 1981) is a former American football player and current singer. Utecht was a tight end for the Indianapolis Colts and the Cincinnati Bengals. He was signed by the Indianapolis Colts as an undrafted free agent in 2004. He played college football at Minnesota. Utecht has also played for the Cincinnati Bengals. He earned a Super Bowl ring with the Colts in Super Bowl XLI over the Chicago Bears.

Early years
Utecht graduated from Hastings Senior High School in Hastings, Minnesota where he helped lead the Raiders to a State Semi-Final appearance.

College career
Utecht became a four-year starter at the University of Minnesota, starting 35 of 44 games and playing in the Music City Bowl.

Professional career

Indianapolis Colts
He signed as a free agent with the Colts on April 30, 2004. Utecht did not see much action in the 2004 and 2005 seasons. His best season was the 2006 season, with 37 receptions for 377 yards. In the 2006 postseason, Utecht had 5 receptions for 41 yards. He would then go on to help the Colts win Super Bowl XLI. In 2007, he caught 31 receptions for 364 yards and a touchdown. Utecht became a restricted free agent in the 2008 offseason.

Cincinnati Bengals
On March 14, the Cincinnati Bengals signed him to an offer sheet believed to be worth $9 million over three seasons. The Colts had seven days to match the contract and retain Utecht, but the March 21 deadline passed and Utecht became a member of the Bengals. Prior to the start of the 2009 season, Utecht suffered a concussion during practice, which was aired on the HBO Television show "Hard Knocks". On August 31, 2009, Utecht was placed on the injured reserve list for the Cincinnati Bengals. He was released on November 17 with an injury settlement.

Ben Utecht – receiving statistics

Singing career
Following his fifth concussion, Utecht ended his football career to focus on a second career in music. He maintained an interest in performing throughout high school, college and his professional football career and had intended to pursue a musical career after football. Utecht has recorded several albums including a Christmas album for which he was nominated for a 2012 Dove Award. He also went on tour in January 2012 and was featured on the cover of the March/April 2012 issue of Making Music Magazine.

Personal life
The son of a Methodist Minister, Utecht recorded an Inspirational music album, released on May 5, 2009, on Sandi Patty's Stylos label.

His wife, Karyn (Stordahl) of Owatonna, Minnesota, also attended the University of Minnesota and was Miss Minnesota, 2005. Ben and Karyn are parents to four daughters.

Traumatic brain injury
Utecht, who suffered five known concussions during his football career, was already experiencing memory loss by late 2011, when he was 30 years old. Utecht released his single "You Will Always Be My Girls" in 2014 dedicated to his family in form of a letter to his wife Karyn and his daughters, as Utecht fears that one day that his brain injuries will lead him to not know them.

Other media 
Utecht also wrote the book Counting the Days Until My Mind Slips Away.

Discography
(credited as Benjamin Utecht)

Albums
Ben Utecht
Man Up
Two of Hearts: Cherished Love Song Duets (jointly with Anne Cochran) 
Christmas Hope: An Inspirational Holiday Collection

Singles
"You Will Always Be My Girls" (2014)

References

External links
 

1981 births
Living people
American performers of Christian music
American football tight ends
Cincinnati Bengals players
Concussion activists
Indianapolis Colts players
Minnesota Golden Gophers football players
People from Hastings, Minnesota
Sportspeople from Rochester, Minnesota
Musicians from Minnesota
Players of American football from Minnesota
American United Methodists